Anri Okhanashvili (born 10 June 1985) is a Georgian politician and lawyer. Since 2020, he has been a member of the Parliament of Georgia of the 10th convocation by party list, election bloc: Georgian Dream - Democratic Georgia. He also was member of 9th convocation of Parliament of Georgia (2016-2020).

References

Members of the Parliament of Georgia
1985 births
Living people
21st-century politicians from Georgia (country)
Georgian Dream politicians